Akel Hamdan (born 1 November 1953) is a Syrian long-distance runner. He competed in the men's 10,000 metres at the 1980 Summer Olympics.

References

1953 births
Living people
Athletes (track and field) at the 1980 Summer Olympics
Syrian male long-distance runners
Olympic athletes of Syria
Place of birth missing (living people)
20th-century Syrian people